Carol Lynn Townes is an American soul singer from Warrenton, North Carolina.

Career
Hailing from a family of gospel singers, she made her debut singing gospel at age three. She moved to New York in the early 1970s, joining a male soul group called Fifth Avenue. The group consisted of prominent jingle singers. With Townes as lead singer, the group recorded the single, "Wheeler Dealer", for Buddha Records, and followed with an album on RCA Records in 1976. But it was not until nearly a decade later that Townes achieved commercial success.

Signed to Polydor in 1982 as a solo artist, she recorded a cover version of Alton McClain & Destiny's "99 ½" for the Breakin' soundtrack in 1984. This became a Top10 dance club hit and made #22 on the US Billboard R&B chart, and #77 on the Billboard Hot 100. It peaked at #47 in the UK Singles Chart in August 1984. She then recorded "Believe In The Beat" for the follow-up film, Breakin' 2: Electric Boogaloo, in which she appeared at the end, performing the song. This track reached #56 in the UK and number 65 in Australia. This led to her own solo album, Satisfaction Guaranteed. She then recorded a second album, Try Me Out, released in 1988. This was followed by the 12" single "What I Wouldn't Do" on Easy Street in 1989, and a dance version of The Grass Roots' hit "Midnight Confessions" on Life Line in 1993.

Discography

Albums

Singles

References

Year of birth missing (living people)
Living people
American women singers
American soul singers
21st-century American women